Roberta Findlay (née Hershkowitz; born 1948) is an American film director, cinematographer, producer and actress. She is best known for her work in the exploitation field. Her work has received increasing critical appreciation in recent years.

Early life
Findlay was born Roberta Hershkowitz in Brooklyn, New York City to Hungarian-Jewish immigrant parents, and was raised in the Bronx. She was classically trained on piano as a child, and her parents hoped she would have a career as a musician.

Career
While attending the City College of New York, she met Michael Findlay, a student who had recently transferred there after leaving seminary school, where he was studying to become a Catholic priest. He asked her to perform a piano accompaniment for a silent film screening he was holding on the university campus. The two eventually married and began making films together, with Roberta often working as cinematographer.

By her own account, Roberta's marriage to Michael was tempestuous, and the couple were separated by 1974 due to him suffering "psychological issues." Despite their separation, she continued to occasionally work with him professionally, including as cinematographer on Shriek of the Mutilated (1974). Michael Findlay died in 1977 in a helicopter accident;  after his death, she continued to make films, directing the horror films Blood Sisters (1987) and Tenement (1985).

Select filmography

Feature films

Pornography

References

Further reading

External links

Roberta Findlay at Letterbox DVD

1948 births
Living people
American film directors
American people of Hungarian-Jewish descent
City College of New York alumni
People from the Bronx